Hammatoderus sallei is a species of beetle in the family Cerambycidae. It was described by James Thomson in 1860. It is known from Mexico.

References

Hammatoderus
Beetles described in 1860